Sannikov is a Russian masculine surname derived from the word sannik, sledge-maker; its feminine counterpart is Sannikova. It is transliterated in German as Sannikoff and in Belarusian as Sannikau. Notable people with the surname include:

Alena Sannikova (born 1980), Belarusian cross country skier
 Andrei Sannikov (born 1954), Belarusian opposition activist
 Dmitri Sannikov (born 1983),  Russian professional football player
 Mikhail Sannikov (born 1961), Russian buddhist lama 
 Pelageya Shajn (née Sannikova 1894–1956), Russian astronomer
 Yakov Sannikov (1780-c. 1812), Russian explorer
 Yuliy Sannikov (born 1978), Ukrainian economist

See also
 Sannikov Land, phantom island named after the explorer
 Sannikov Strait, strait in Russia named after the explorer

Russian-language surnames